Walter Lewis Bush, Jr. (September 25, 1929 – September 22, 2016) was an American ice hockey administrator. He was born in Minneapolis, Minnesota.

In 1955, he helped start the Central Hockey League, which turned into one of the few successful minor professional hockey leagues of that era. In 1960, he organized and promoted a semi-pro Northwestern League consisting of 6 teams in Minnesota, Iowa and Nebraska sanctioned under the auspices of the Amateur Hockey Association of the United States (AHAUS), and that included several former college players, including Doug Woog of the University of Minnesota who played for both St. Paul and Lincoln, and Canadian center Billy Colpitts of the University of North Dakota who played for Sioux City.  Also skating one season for the Sioux City Eagles was 1960 Olympic Gold Medalist Bob Owen.  This league was notable for the fact that it was responsible for developing a very strong fan base in the host cities of Edina, St. Paul, Omaha, Sioux City and Lincoln, many of which subsequently became the homes of the oldest franchises in the United States Hockey League's (USHL) Western Division.  He was also instrumental in bringing National Hockey League hockey to his home state with the Minnesota North Stars as a minority owner. As the president of USA Hockey for nearly two decades, he was instrumental in the efforts that brought women's hockey into the Olympic program in 1998. He assumed in June 2003 the position of USA Hockey's chairman of the board, a position he was still holding in May 2009.

Bush was vice-president of the International Ice Hockey Federation (IIHF) in 1996, when he and Kimmo Leinonen led efforts to establish the IIHF Hall of Fame.

From 1996 to 2001, he was the owner and chairman of the board of the American Hockey League's Kentucky Thoroughblades.

He was inducted into the United States Hockey Hall of Fame in 1980 and later inducted into the Hockey Hall of Fame in 2000. He was awarded the Olympic Order in 2002, and was inducted into the IIHF Hall of Fame in 2009.

He was portrayed in the 2004 Disney film Miracle by Sean McCann.  Bush died on September 22, 2016, at the age of 86.

See also
 List of members of the Hockey Hall of Fame
 List of members of the United States Hockey Hall of Fame
 List of members of the IIHF Hall of Fame

References

External links
 

1929 births
2016 deaths
Dartmouth College alumni
Hockey Hall of Fame inductees
Ice hockey people from Minnesota
IIHF Hall of Fame inductees
International Ice Hockey Federation executives
Lester Patrick Trophy recipients
Minnesota North Stars executives
Recipients of the Olympic Order
Sportspeople from Minneapolis
United States Hockey Hall of Fame inductees
USA Hockey personnel